Cell-0 (pronounced "Cell Zero") is the ninth studio album by Finnish cello metal band Apocalyptica. It was released on 10 January 2020. It is the band's first fully instrumental album since 2003's Reflections, and their first studio release since Shadowmaker, published 4 years and 9 months earlier, marking their longest gap between studio albums.

Background 
Cell-0 was prepared after a lengthy tour in celebration of the 20th anniversary of their debut album, the instrumental Metallica tribute release Plays Metallica by Four Cellos (1996). Such performances inspired them to go back to all-instrumental music, which they hadn't done in 17 years. The audience's positive response to instrumental songs was also taken into account.

It wasn't intended for the tour to be so long, but the positive fan reaction to the announcement of the first shows resulted in more dates being added, increasing the total number of performances from the originally planned 30 to a total of 230. Combined with the Shadowmaker tour shows, the band had played around 500 shows between both albums.

Recording and promotion 
Cell-0 took two months to be written and was recorded, edited and mixed within a five-month period.

It was self-produced by the band and conceived without a label behind it, resulting in more creative freedom, which led cellist Perttu Kivilaakso to notice some progressive elements in their music, specially on the song "Fire & Ice", which begins with Celtic melodies performed by Nightwish flutist Troy Donockley and ends with riffs that he described as "chaotic" and "complex".

On 3 June 2019, the band announced they had completed work on the album, with recording lasting for three months at Sonic Pump Studios, in Helsinki. Later that month, they announced their signing to Silver Lining Music, through which they would release the yet-to-announce studio effort.

On 3 October, the band announced the album's title, cover art and release date. They commented that "it is tough to express without lyrics, but in Cell-0, we found particles of our universe previously unknown to us. Millions of notes combine to create music just as millions of cells combine to create life, and when you visualize the whole thing, similar patterns appear."

On the same day, they released a video for the album opener "Ashes of the Modern World", directed by Ville Juurikkala. On 1 November, they released a video for "Rise", directed by Lisa Mann in collaboration with cinematographer Jason George and meant to depict a live impressionistic painting. On 12 December, another video was released, this time for "En Route to Mayhem", which discuses humans' actions towards life on the planet. On 10 January 2020, simultaneously with the album release, the audio of the title track "Cell-0" was released.

On December 16, 2022, they released a new version of Rise, named Rise Again, with Epica's Simone Simons on vocals, prior to their shared European tour in 2023.

Concept 
The album revolves around a concept created by the band which relates to a "God particle". According to drummer Mikko Sirén, "in our heads, there is this undefined thing that you cannot pinpoint, that you cannot see or feel, but it is there. That's kind of the center of everything in this album." He also said:

He also says the album discusses "politics or social, environmental issues or something like that. It was one of those things that amazingly people have gotten disconnected from each other, from nature, from the earth and everything like that. Maybe the 'Cell-0' is the one thing we lost. We don't have the ability to connect anymore, especially in the last ten years. The world has changed."

The music also reflects humanity's ability to build and destroy. "Humanity is incredible when it comes to building something, but we are capable of destroying even more easily. Like that, the songs burst into pieces at times. We wanted to take a philosophical look at what man builds and what he destroys.

Cover 
The cover of Cell-0 depicts a cello falling apart in particles, so it is linked to the overall particle concept of the album. Kivilaakso said "since we're going back to our roots, it seemed obvious to us to put the cello in front on the cover".

Track listing

Personnel
Apocalyptica
Perttu Kivilaakso – lead cello, programming, arrangements
Eicca Toppinen – rhythm cello, keyboards, programming, arrangements
Paavo Lötjönen – bass cello
Mikko Sirén – drums, percussion

Guest performances
 Troy Donockley – Uilleann pipes, bagpipes on "Fire & Ice"

Technical personnel
Andrew Scheps – mixing

Charts

See also
List of 2020 albums

References 

Apocalyptica albums
2020 albums